The Estonian Students' Society (commonly used acronym: EÜS) is the largest and oldest all-male academical student society in Estonia, and is similar to the Baltic German student organizations known as corporations (Corps) (not to be confused with US college fraternities). It was founded in 1870 at Tartu. It has over 900 members in Estonia and abroad.

In 1881 the Society adopted blue, black and white as its colours. Its first flag was made in 1884 and this tricolour was later (1918) accepted as the National Flag of Estonia. The original flag is still in existence.

In the wake of the Estonian national awakening, many young Estonian intellectuals had ties to the EÜS, and the organization had impact beyond its borders. It was instrumental in the founding of the Estonian National Museum in 1909, and the EÜS library was donated to the museum. The Museum was later split into two, and its Archive Library formed the basis of the Estonian Literary Museum.

The building of the Estonian Students' Society in Tartu has been considered to be one of the first examples of Estonian national architecture. The Treaty of Tartu between Finland and Soviet Russia was signed in the building in 1920.

Former members of the EÜS founded the academic corporations Fraternitas Estica (1907), Sakala (1909) and the association Veljesto.

History

Founding
The Estonian Students' Society was founded on 7 April 1870 (26 March 1870 according to the old calendar) by five undergraduate students and three Estonian intellectuals: Andreas Kurrikoff, Heinrich Rosenthal, Gustav Treffner, Hugo Treffner, Martin Wühner, Jakob Hurt, Wilhelm Eisenschmidt and Johann Voldemar Jannsen. They gathered to read the Estonian national epic Kalevipoeg in the first "Kalevipoeg evening", and decided to continue gatherings in the same form. This decision led to the founding of the Estonian Students' Society, which became the first ethnic Estonian student fraternity.

The 1880s
In 1882 the society tried to establish itself as the corporation Vironia, following the model of Baltic German student corporations, but this was rejected by the other corporations. The name "Estonian Students' Society" came into use in 1883, when the organisation was registered with the University of Tartu as an academic-cultural society; this was the society's first legal registration. In 1889, the society began to publish journals (Est: albumid), consisting of scientific articles, essays and belletristic texts.

Fraternitas Viliensis (1890)
In 1890, the fraternity tried to establish itself as the corporation Fraternitas Viliensis, and this was accepted. Its establishment was however stopped by the Russian official Nikolai Lavrovski, head of the Riga Educational District, and this was the last main attempt to establish the Estonian Students' Society as a corporation; later attempts ended with membership splits and the founding of the corporations Fraternitas Estica (1907) and Sakala (1909), formed in frank imitation of the Baltic German corporations.

Early 20th century

A new building was completed in 1902, designed by Georg Hellat, one of the first professional Estonian architects, who borrowed from art deco and national romanticist styles. The blessing ceremony took place on 10–11 September 1902.

The organisation and its traditions were modelled after Baltic German corporations, but the beginning of the 20th century was a time of change, and some traditions like compulsory fencing lessons – peculiar to the corporations – were abandoned in September 1904. The Estonian Students' Society also made membership voluntary, following the Baltic German corporations' general code of conduct (Allgemeiner Comment).

In the Estonian War of Independence (1918–1920)
On 24 November 1918 the Estonian Students' Society decided to join in corpore the Estonian military forces to fight in the Estonian War of Independence. Thirteen members died and 63 students and alumni were awarded the Cross of Liberty.

During Estonian independence (1920–1940)
In 1925 Johan Kõpp's Eesti Üliõpilaste Seltsi ajalugu I.1870–1905 (History of the Estonian Students' Society I.1870–1905) was published. The building was enlarged in 1930 following the design of architect Artur Kirsipuu.

Symbols

Flag
In 1881, the fraternity decided to adopt blue, black, and white as its colours. The first blue-black-white flag was made in the spring of 1884. Since this flag were banned in Tartu, the flag was blessed on 4 June 1884 in Otepää.

The flag achieved national importance at the beginning of the 20th century: the provisional Government of the Republic of Estonia declared the blue-black-white tricolour the official Estonian National Flag on 21 November 1918. This decision, although not formally recorded in "Riigi Teataja" (the State Gazette), was the first time the tricolour flag was associated with the Estonian nation.

The original flag is still in possession of the Estonian Students' Society and is preserved in the Estonian National Museum. The flag was publicly displayed at the Church of Otepää during the 120th anniversary of the flag's blessing in June 2004, and during the 90th Anniversary of the Republic of Estonia at St. Elizabeth's Church in Pärnu in February 2008.

Coat of Arms
The present coat of arms was developed in 1890, when the fraternity tried to establish itself as Corporation Fraternitas Viliensis. It consists of three flags on each side, a knight's helmet, a shield and an oak corona.

There is a white open book on the upper left field of the shield. The book's title is Carpe diem, meaning "Seize the day", the guiding principle of the fraternity. The motto, however, is Fortiter in re suaviter in modo, meaning "Gentle in manner, resolute in execution." It is written as the acronyms "F.I.R" on the left and "S.I.M." on right side of the corona.

Historical ties
The Estonian Students Society has partnership agreements with four foreign student organisations. In 1928, the Estonian Students Society concluded an agreement with the Finnish "Nations" (Nationes) Etelä-Pohjalainen Osakunta and Pohjois-Pohjalainen Osakunta of the University of Helsinki, the first agreement concluded between Estonian and Finnish student organisations.

In 1937, an agreement with the student society Austrums of the University of Riga, Latvia, followed. In 1991, a further agreement was concluded with the Finnish-Swedish "Nation" Vasa nation of the University of Helsinki. The Estonian Students Society and its Finnish partner organisations exchange visiting students.

Structure

The organisation consists of two legal bodies:
 Estonian Students' Society, founded in 1870 and registered with the University of Tartu on 30 December 1988, and with the Tartu Municipal Government;
 Alumni Association of the Estonian Students' Society, founded in 1884 and registered pursuant to the Non-profit Associations Act of the Republic of Estonia on 8 March 1995 (Reg. no 80055073).

Members

Honorary alumni 

 Jakob Hurt
 Heinrich Rosenthal
 Karl August Hermann
 Heinrich Koppel
 Martin Wühner
 Jaan Tõnisson
 Aleksander Mohrfeldt
 Matthias Johann Eisen
 Johan Kõpp
 Oskar Kallas
 Anton Schulzenberg
 Gustav Suits
 Aadu Lüüs
 Viktor Kargaja
 Johan Müller
 August Torma
 Karl Kook
 Ferdinand Petersen
 Ilmar Raamot
 Ilmar Rebane
 Heino Riomar
 Gustav Ränk
 Henno Lender (:et)
 Leonhard Urm
 Artur Grönberg
 Karl Aun
 Artur Taska
 August Pakosta
 Villem Raam
 Konrad Veem
 Elmar Ernst Anderson
 Edgar Heinsoo
 Jaan Kross
 Eduard Leetmaa
 Udo Petersoo
 Harald Tammur
 Uno Plank
 Ilo Aasa
 Heinrich Toots
 Enn Sarv
 Alfred Johannes Tanimäe
 Andres Koern
 Udo Mällo
 Vello Mänd
 Eero Tamm
 Jaan Timusk
 Heino Oskar Valvur
 Vello Salo

Chapters
Up to 1936, all members of the Estonian Students Society were without exception students of the University of Tartu. From 1936, students of Tallinn University of Technology were also accepted. This led to the founding of the Tallinn Chapter for undergraduates, i.e. active members. An alumni chapter in Tallinn was established in 1921. From 1945, various chapters of the Estonian Students Society were formed abroad by expatriate members and began their activities in Sweden, Germany, Australia, the United Kingdom, Canada, the United States and Argentina.

The currently-active chapters are:
 Tallinn Chapter
Pärnu Chapter
 Baltimore-Washington Chapter
 California Chapter
 Göteborg Chapter
 Stockholm Chapter
 Toronto Chapter
 Brussels Chapter

Chapters of the Estonian Students Society overseas accept students from different universities and higher educational institutions.

Bibliography
 Hein, Ants. Maja kui sümbol: Eesti Üliõpilaste Seltsi hoone Tartus. 2007. 
 Kõpp, Johan. Eesti Üliõpilaste Seltsi Ajalugu 1870–1905, I. Tartu, 1925.
 Grönberg, Artur. Eesti Üliõpilaste Seltsi ajalugu. II, Iseseisvuse eelvõitluses (1906–1917). Omariikluse saavutustes (1918–1940), Montreal, 1985.
 Vivat Academia: üliõpilasseltsid ja -korporatsioonid Eestis. Tallinn, 2007.

References

External links

 
 Estonia's Blue-Black-White Tricolour Flag
 Google maps link
 Wikimapia link

University of Tartu
1870s establishments in Estonia
Student organizations established in 1870